The 4th Military Region of Vietnam People's Army, is directly under the Ministry of Defence of Vietnam, tasked to organise, build, manage and command armed forces defending the North Central Vietnam. The predecessor, 4th War Zone was established by the order of Ho Chi Minh on 15 October 1945, and this day has become the traditional day of the Military Zone. On 3 June 1957, Ho Chi Minh signed the ordinance 17/SL to establish 4th Military Zones on the basis of 4th Joint Zone, simultaneously with other military zones: the North Vietnamese, North West, North East, Left Bank, Right Bank.

 Command Headquarters: Road Lê Duẩn, Vinh city
 Commander: Lieutenant General Nguyễn Doãn Anh: member of Central Committee of the Communist Party of Vietnam XIII
 Political Commissar: Lieutenant General Trần Võ Dũng    
 Deputy Commander cum Chief of Staff: Major General Hà Thọ Bình

Agencies
 Department of Staff 
 Department of Politics  
 Division of Organisation 
 Division of Cadre 
 Division of Policy 
 Division of Propogendar and Training 
 Division of Thoughts and Culture 
 Military Court of Military Zone
 Military Procuratorate of Military Zone 
 Military Museum of 4th Military Zone: Road Lê Duẩn, Vinh city. 
 Newspaper of 4th Military Zone 
 Troupe of 4th Military Zone
 Football Club of 4th Military Zone
 Department of Logistics
 Department of Technology
 Workshop 41 
 Warehouse CK1  
 Warehouse 830 
 Office of Command of 4th Military Zone

Units
 Military Command of Thanh Hóa Province
 Military Command of Nghệ An  
 Military Command of Hà Tĩnh 
 Military Command of Quảng Bình 
 Military Command of Quảng Trị
 Military Command of Thừa Thiên–Huế 
 Military School of Military Zone
 324 Division (titled as "Ngu Binh" troops): established on 7 January 1955 at Triều Dương Town, Tĩnh Gia County, Thanh Hóa Province. Present Headquarters of the Division is located in Lạc Sơn Town, Đô Lương County, Nghệ An Province. 
 341 Infantry Division (titled as "Cả River" troops): established on 22 December 1972 in Nam Đàn County, Nghệ An Province. 
 968th Infantry Division
 337 Defence Economics Division 
 283rd Anti-Aircraft Brigade 
 414th Combat Engineering Brigade 
 80th Communication Regiment: honoured as Hero of People's Armed Forces of Vietnam in 2005. 
 16th Artillery Brigade: located on Thuận An Town, Phú Vang County, Thừa Thiên–Huế Province, established on 13 April 1966 in Vĩnh Phúc Province. Honoured as Heroes of the People's Armed Forces of Vietnam in 2006. 
 206th Tank Regiment 
 Controlling Cooperation of International Cooperation of 4th Military Zone- Board Chairman: Senior Colonel Lê Đình Tứ (honoured as Hero of Labour of Vietnam in 2007) 
 Construction and Installation Company of 4th Military Zone: located in Hồng Lĩnh, Hà Tĩnh Province. 
 4th Military Hospital.

Successive Commander and Leadership

Commanders
 Major General Lê Thiết Hùng (1946–1947): Leader of 4th War Zone. 
 Chu Văn Tấn (1947–1948): Leader of 4th War Zone. 
 Major General Nguyễn Sơn (1948–1949): Commander of 4th Joint Zone 
 Colonel Hoàng Minh Thảo (1949–1950): After that, he was Senior Lieutenant General, Professor, honoured as People's Teacher of Vietnam. 
 Trần Sâm: Major General (1959), Lieutenant General (1974), Colonel General (1986).  
 Major General Nguyễn Đôn (1956–1959): Lieutenant General (1974) 
 Major General Chu Huy Mân (1961–1962): Colonel General (1974), General (1980), vice-Chairman of the State Council. 
 Major General Trần Văn Quang (1962–1965): Lieutenant General (1974), Colonel General (1984). 
 Senior Colonel Vũ Nam Long (1965–1966): Lieutenant General in 1981. 
 Senior Colonel Đàm Quang Trung (1967–1971): Major General (April 1974), Lieutenant General (January 1980), Colonel General (1984), vice-chairman of the State Council Vietnam. 
 Major General Vương Thừa Vũ (1971–1973): Lieutenant General (1974). 
 Major General Đàm Quang Trung (1973–1976) 
 Major General Hoàng Minh Thi (1978–1982):  member of Central Committee of the Communist Party of Vietnam (1976–1982) 
 Lieutenant General Hoàng Cầm (1982–1986): Colonel General (1987), General Inspector of the Army. 
 Lieutenant General Nguyễn Quốc Thước : former vice-Chairman and Secretary-General of Vietnam Veterans Association 
 Lieutenant General Nguyễn Khắc Dương 
 Lieutenant General Trương Đình Thanh (2002–2005) 
 Lieutenant General Đoàn Sinh Hưởng (2005–2009) 
 Lieutenant General Nguyễn Hữu Cường (2009-2014)
 Lieutenant General Nguyễn Tân Cương (2014-2018)
 Lieutenant General Nguyễn Doãn Anh (2018-present)

Political Commissioners, Deputy Commanders of Politics 
 Trần Văn Quang (1946–1948): Political Commissar of War Zone 4. 
 Major General Nguyễn Sơn (1948–1949): Political Commissar 
 Trần Sâm: Major General (1959), Lieutenant General (1974), Colonel General (1986). 
 Major General Chu Huy Mân (1957–1958): Political Commissar 
 Major General Nguyễn Trọng Vĩnh (1958–1961):Political Commissar 
 Major General Chu Huy Mân (1961–1962): Political Commissar 
 Major General Lê Hiến Mai (1965–1967): Political Commissar 
 Major General Hoàng Kiện (1967–1970)  
 Major General Đàm Quang Trung (1973–1975): Political Commissar 
 Lieutenant General Đặng Hòa (1982–1988): Deputy Commander of Politics 
 Major General Lê Văn Giánh: Deputy Commander of Politics 
 Major General Phạm Văn Long: Deputy Commander of political 
 Lieutenant General Phạm Hồng Minh (-1/3/2007): Deputy Commander of Politics. 
 Major General Mai Quang Phấn (3/2007-2012 ): Political Commissar
 Lieutenant General Võ Văn Việt (2012-2017): Political Commissar
 Lieutenant General Trần Võ Dũng (2017-present): Political Commissar

Military regions of the People's Army of Vietnam